Louis Watson may refer to:

 Louis H. Watson (1906–1936), American contract bridge player and writer
 Louis L. Watson (1895–?), American college football player and coach

See also
 Lewis Watson (disambiguation)